Breaking All The Rules is the debut and only album by American pop girl group She Moves.
The album was released in November 1997. The Japan release included a bonus track, "Forever Young", as well as a full-color booklet with lyrics.  The album contains a cover of the Tim McGraw and Faith Hill duet, "It's Your Love".

Track listing
"Breaking All The Rules" (Christian Berman, Frank Berman, Jeff Coplan, Matt Dexter) – 3:29
"Wouldn't It Be Good" (Nik Kershaw) – 3:58
"Just For Tonight" (Berman, Berman, Coplan, Dexter) – 3:35
"You Make Me Believe In Magic" (Berman, Berman, M. Dexter, Kama) – 3:28
"Come Back to Me" (Berman, Berman, Coplan) – 4:16
"Do You Know" (Carla Duren, Danielle Flora, Diana Bologna) – 3:47
"Every Time You Touch Me" (I Get High) (Irving Berman, Coplan, Kama) – 3:36
"Perfect Sin" (Berman, Berman, Coplan, Flora) – 3:38
"It's Your Love" (Stephony Smith) – 3:51
"Let's Keep It Going On" (Berman, Berman, Coplan) – 3:30
"Homesick" (Berman, Berman, Coplan, Duren) – 3:46
"Breaking All The Rules" (Berman Brothers Dance Mix) – 3:36
"Forever Young" (Marian Gold, Bernhard Lloyd, Frank Mertens) – 3:51 (International Bonus Track)
"Just For Tonight" (Berman Brothers Remix) - 3:18 (Japan Only Bonus Track)

Personnel

She Moves
Carla Duren, Danielle Flora, Diana Bologna: Lead & Backing Vocals

Additional musicians
Dr. Mo, Matt Dexter, Touch: Keyboards, Drum Programming
Jeff Coplan: Acoustic & Electric Guitars

Production
All Songs Arranged By She Moves, The Berman Brothers & Jeff Coplan
Produced By The Berman Brothers
Recorded, Engineered & Mixed By Akira Takahashi & Touch
Mastered By Chris Gehringer

External links
"Breaking All The Rules" at allmusic

1997 debut albums
Geffen Records albums